Macroglossini is a tribe of moths of the family Sphingidae described by Thaddeus William Harris in 1839.

Taxonomy 

 Subtribe Choerocampina Grote & Robinson, 1865
Genus Basiothia Walker, 1856
Genus Cechenena Rothschild & Jordan, 1903
Genus Centroctena Rothschild & Jordan, 1903
Genus Chaerocina Rothschild & Jordan, 1903
Genus Deilephila Laspeyres, 1809
Genus Euchloron Boisduval, 1875
Genus Griseosphinx Cadiou & Kitching, 1990
Genus Hippotion Hübner, 1819
Genus Hyles Hübner, 1819
Genus Pergesa Walker, 1856
Genus Phanoxyla Rothschild & Jordan, 1903
Genus Rhagastis Rothschild & Jordan, 1903
Genus Rhodafra Rothschild & Jordan, 1903
Genus Theretra Hübner, 1819
Genus Xylophanes Hübner, 1819

 Subtribe Macroglossina Harris, 1839
Genus Acosmerycoides Mell, 1922
Genus Acosmeryx Boisduval, 1875
Genus Altijuba Lachlan, 1999
Genus Ampelophaga Bremer & Grey, 1853
Genus Amphion Hübner, 1819
Genus Angonyx Boisduval, 1874
Genus Antinephele Holland, 1889
Genus Atemnora Rothschild & Jordan, 1903
Genus Cizara Walker, 1856
Genus Clarina Tutt, 1903
Genus Dahira Moore, 1888
Genus Daphnis Hübner, 1819
Genus Darapsa Walker, 1856
Genus Deidamia Clemens, 1859
Genus Elibia Walker, 1856
Genus Enpinanga Rothschild & Jordan, 1903
Genus Eupanacra Cadiou & Holloway, 1989
Genus Euproserpinus Grote & Robinson, 1865
Genus Eurypteryx Felder, 1874
Genus Giganteopalpus Huwe, 1895
Genus Gnathothlibus Wallengren, 1858
Genus Hayesiana D. S. Fletcher, 1982
Genus Hypaedalea Butler, 1877
Genus Leucostrophus Rothschild & Jordan, 1903
Genus Maassenia Saalmüller, 1884
Genus Macroglossum Scopoli, 1777
Genus Micracosmeryx Mell, 1922
Genus Microsphinx Rothschild & Jordan, 1903
Genus Neogurelca Hogenes & Treadaway, 1993
Genus Nephele Hübner, 1819
Genus Odontosida Rothschild & Jordan, 1903
Genus Philodila Rothschild & Jordan, 1903
Genus Proserpinus Hübner, 1819
Genus Pseudenyo Holland, 1889
Genus Pseudoangonyx Eitschberger, 2010
Genus Rethera Rothschild & Jordan, 1903
Genus Sphecodina Blanchard, 1840
Genus Sphingonaepiopsis Wallengren, 1858
Genus Temnora Walker, 1856
Genus Temnoripais Rothschild & Jordan, 1903
Genus Zacria Haxaire & Melichar, 2003

 
Macroglossinae (moth)
Taxa named by Thaddeus William Harris